Vivian Earl Dickinson (July 7, 1924 – June 15, 2006) was an American attorney and politician who served as a member of the  Virginia House of Delegates from 1972 until his retirement in 2002.

References

External links

1924 births
2006 deaths
University of Richmond alumni
University of Virginia School of Law alumni
Virginia lawyers
Democratic Party members of the Virginia House of Delegates
People from Spotsylvania County, Virginia